Live and Mo' is the tenth studio album by Keb' Mo'. It was released on October 20, 2009. It is his first album released by the Yolabelle International label which he started after leaving Sony Music in 2004. It is his first album to include live recordings, intertwined with studio tracks hand-picked by Mo' himself. The album is underlined with soul and jazz, and has a laid-back feel to it.

Track listing
"Victims Of Comfort" (Kevin Moore, Tim Kimber) - 4:00
"More Than One Way Home" (John Lewis Parker, Kevin Moore) - 4:58
"Change" (Kevin Moore) - 4:23
"Shave Yo' Legs" (Jeff Paris, Kevin Moore) - 4:43
"Hole In The Bucket" (John Lewis Parker, Kevin Moore)  - 2:54
"One Friend" (Kevin Moore, Zuriani Zonneveld) - 3:26
"The Action" (Kevin Moore) - 4:33
"Perpetual Blues Machines" (Georgina Graper, Kevin Moore) - 5:27
"Government Cheese" (Kevin Moore) - 4:39
"A Brand New America" (John Lewis Parker, Kevin Moore) - 3:21

Live personnel
Keb' Mo' - guitars, harmonica, vocals
Clayton Gibb - electric guitar, Dobro
Jeff Paris - leyboards, vocals, mandolin
Reggie McBride - bass guitar, vocals
Les Falconer - drums, vocals

Studio personnel
Keb' Mo' - guitars, bass guitar (tr.1), vocals, harmonica (tr. 2), mandolin (tr. 2)
Les King - bass guitar (tr.2)
Kevin Moore II - drums (tr.1, 5, 10)
Jeff Paris - keyboards (tr.1, 9)
Courtney Branch - percussion (tr.1, 2, 9, 10)
Lavalle Belle - drums (tr.9)
Andrew Gouche' - bass guitar (tr.9)
Tracy Carter - keyboards (tr.9)
Paulie Cerra - tenor saxophone (tr.9)
Paul Literall- trumpet (tr.9)
Kevin McCormick - bass guitar (tr.10)
Gregory Wachter - keyboards (tr.10)
Agape Children's Choir - vocals (tr.10)
Calabria Foti- violin (tr.10)

Tracks 1, 5, 9 and 10 are studio recordings. Tracks 2, 3, 4, 6, 7 and 8 are recorded live.

References

2009 live albums
Live blues albums
Keb' Mo' albums